The Aigle was a 50 gun ship of the line of the French Navy. Built at Rochefort by P. Morineau between 1748 and 1749, she was launched on 16 July 1750. She was commanded by chevalier de Cousages during the Canadian campaign as part of Bullion de Montlouet's fleet in May 1755. She was decommissioned in 1758.

Sources

http://www.agh.qc.ca/articles/?id=21
Dictionnaire de la flotte de guerre française, Jean-Michel Roche

1750 ships
Ships of the line of the French Navy